

See also 
 New Jersey's at-large congressional district special election, 1808
 United States House of Representatives elections, 1808 and 1809
 List of United States representatives from New Jersey

1808
New Jersey
United States House of Representatives